The Javan banded pitta (Hydrornis guajanus) is a species of bird in the family Pittidae. It is found in Java and Bali. It was formerly considered conspecific with the Bornean and Malayan banded pittas.  Together, they were referenced as the banded pitta.

References

Rheindt, F.E., and J.A. Eaton. 2010. Biological species limits in the Banded Pitta Pitta guajana. Forktail number 26: 86–91.

Javan banded pitta
Birds of Java
Birds of Bali
Javan banded pitta